Diego Rodrigo Herrera Larrea (born April 20, 1969 in Pichincha, Ecuador) is a retired footballer from Ecuador. He played as a forward during his career.

Herrera obtained a total number of 11 caps for the Ecuador national football team during the 1990s, scoring no goals.

Honors

Club
 LDU Quito
 Serie A de Ecuador: 1990

International
 Ecuador
 Korea Cup: 1995

References

1969 births
Living people
Ecuadorian footballers
Association football midfielders
Ecuador international footballers
1995 Copa América players
L.D.U. Quito footballers
Barcelona S.C. footballers
C.D. El Nacional footballers